Animal Tracks is the Animals' third album in the United States, released as both LP Record and Reel to reel tape.  Musically, it was a hodge-podge of the group's recent hit singles mixed in with tracks of assorted vintage that had not been included on either of The Animals' first two U.S. albums. As such it bore little resemblance in content or purpose to the band's British release also named Animal Tracks from four months earlier. "The Story of Bo Diddley" is an adaptation and expansion of a song recorded by Bo Diddley in 1960, utilizing some of the original lyrics but with additional verses and melody recapping the musician's life in a talking blues style.

Track listing

Personnel
The Animals
 Eric Burdon – vocals
 Alan Price – keyboards except as indicated below
 Dave Rowberry – keyboards on "We Gotta Get Out Of This Place" and "I Can't Believe It"
 Hilton Valentine – guitar
 Chas Chandler – bass 
 John Steel – drums
Production
Mickie Most – producer, liner notes
Val Valentin – engineer
George Joseph - photography

References

1965 albums
The Animals albums
Albums produced by Mickie Most
MGM Records albums